The Diadematacia  are a type of sea urchins. Unlike most other sea urchins, they generally have hollow spines. The tubercles on their tests are perforated, and most species possess gills.

References
 

Echinoidea
Extant Late Triassic first appearances